Town Policy (1975–1984) was a Quarter Horse racehorse, noted not only for his achievements on the racetrack, but for disappearing from his stall in 1977 and being recovered five months later in Mexico. A mere ten weeks after being recovered, Town Policy went on to win the Los Alamitos Derby by two and a half lengths. He broke his shoulder in an allowance race on January 3, 1984 and was buried in the infield of Los Alamitos Race Course the next day.

Town Policy was inducted into the AQHA Hall of Fame in 1998.

Notes

References

 AQHA Hall of Fame accessed on September 2, 2017

External links
 Town Policy Pedigree at All Breed Pedigree
 Town Policy at Quarter Horse Directory
 Town Policy at Quarter Horse Legends

American Quarter Horse racehorses
1975 racehorse births
1984 racehorse deaths
AQHA Hall of Fame (horses)